Tanaka Chivanga (born 24 July 1993) is a Zimbabwean cricketer. He made his international debut for the Zimbabwe cricket team in May 2022.

Career
In December 2020, he was selected to play for the Eagles in the 2020–21 Logan Cup. He made his first-class debut on 9 December 2020, for Eagles, in the 2020–21 Logan Cup tournament.

He made his Twenty20 debut on 10 April 2021, for also for Eagles, in the 2020–21 Zimbabwe Domestic Twenty20 Competition. On 14 April 2021, the match between Eagles and Rocks went to a Super Over, with Chivanga named the man of the match due to his bowling at the end of the game. Three days later, Chivanga was named in Zimbabwe's squad for their Twenty20 International (T20I) series against Pakistan. Prior to his selection to the national team, Chivanga had also played for the Zimbabwe A cricket team. On 26 April 2021, Chivanga was named in Zimbabwe's Test squad, also for the series against Pakistan.

In May 2021, he was named in the Zimbabwe A squad for their series against South Africa A. He made his List A debut on 29 May 2021, for Zimbabwe A against South Africa A. In July 2021, Chivanga was named in Zimbabwe's Test squad for their one-off match against Bangladesh.

In May 2022, Chivanga was named in Zimbabwe's T20I squad for their five-match home series against Namibia. He made his T20I debut on 17 May 2022, for Zimbabwe against Namibia. The following month, he was named in Zimbabwe's One Day International (ODI) squad for their series against Afghanistan. He made his ODI debut on 4 June 2022, for Zimbabwe against Afghanistan.

On 12 February 2023, Chivanga made his Test debut against the West Indies.

References

External links
 

1993 births
Living people
Zimbabwean cricketers
Zimbabwe One Day International cricketers
Zimbabwe Twenty20 International cricketers
Mashonaland Eagles cricketers
Place of birth missing (living people)